Assyrian Democratic Organization (ADO), also known as "Mtakasta/Mtakasto", founded in Syria in 1957, is the oldest Assyrian political organization in Syria. The group is part of the Syrian National Council since October 2011, and the Assad government has long banned it from political life and restricted its activities in Syria.

The ADO was established as a national, political and democratic movement having with the objectives of safeguarding the existence of the Assyrian people and the realization of its legitimate national aspirations (political, cultural, administrative) in its historic homeland.

History
In March 2017, 2 ADO offices in Qamishli and al-Malikiyah were shut down by Rojavan authorities due to a lack of a permit. On 12 April, an official in the governing Movement for a Democratic Society (TEV-DEM) met with Gabriel Moushe Gawrieh, head of the ADO, and discussed the incident and the "need to respect the laws of the administration". It was the first time TEV-DEM officials met with the ADO.

References

External links
Official website

1957 establishments in Syria
Assyrian political parties
Assyrians in Syria
National Coalition of Syrian Revolutionary and Opposition Forces
Organizations of the Syrian civil war
Political parties established in 1957
Political parties in Syria
Political parties in the Autonomous Administration of North and East Syria
Political parties of minorities in Syria
Syrian opposition